Rainy Lake 17B is a First Nations reserve in Rainy River District, Ontario. It is one of the reserves of the Naicatchewenin First Nation.

References

Anishinaabe reserves in Ontario
Communities in Rainy River District